Abdul Hameed is a Pakistani politician who is the elected member of the Gilgit Baltistan Assembly.

Political career
Hameed contested 2020 Gilgit-Baltistan Assembly election on 15 November 2020 from constituency GBA-23 (Ghanche-II) as an Independent candidate. He won the election by the margin of 370 votes over the runner up Amina Ansari of Pakistan Tehreek-e-Insaf (PTI). He garnered 3,666 votes while Ansari received 3,296 votes. After winning the election, Hameed joined PTI.

References

Living people
Gilgit-Baltistan MLAs 2020–2025
Politicians from Gilgit-Baltistan
Year of birth missing (living people)